Mingma Sherpa-  (born June 16, 1978) is a Nepali mountaineer from Makalu Village, which is located in Sankhuwasabha district of Nepal.
On May 20, 2011, at age 32, Sherpa became the first person from Nepal and the first South Asian to scale all 14 of the world's highest mountains. In the process, he set a new world record by becoming the first mountaineer to climb all 14 peaks on the first attempt. Mingma Sherpa and his brother, Chhang Dawa Sherpa, hold the Guinness World Records of the world's first two brothers to successfully summit the fourteen eight thousanders

Journey to Eight thousanders
The Sherpa brothers used supplementary oxygen only on the four highest mountains out of all 8000ers. They climbed all eight thousanders with no sponsor. Until Mingma climbed nine 8000ers as a Sherpa guide and then went to Japan for work. In 2009 Mingma returned to Nepal and climbed the remaining 5 other 8000ers.

Mingma Sherpa is the managing director of Seven Summit Treks, which organizes expedition over the Himalayas in Nepal, China and Pakistan.

Ascent of unclimbed peak 

In 2020 - Dec 11, Mingma Sherpa along with Swiss Climber Sophie Lavaud, Dawa Sangay and Tenjing Sherpa made first ever summit of Kyungya Ri peak (6506m) located in Langtang Valley.

8000m Peaks summited by Mingma Sherpa

Seven Summits by Mingma Sherpa

Pole Explore

References

Living people
1978 births
Nepalese mountain climbers
People from Sankhuwasabha District
Sherpa summiters of Mount Everest
Nepalese summiters of Mount Everest
Summiters of all 14 eight-thousanders